The Dobličica is a stream in White Carniola. It is part of a karst aquifer. Due to its geological and hydrological characteristics and urbanization of the area, it is considered sensitive and subject to pollution.

Geography
The bed of the lake is covered with large boulders, among which karst water flows from two depressions. A karst spring with a constant flow feeds the lake, with an outflow in a broad but shallow channel. The upper part of the stream bed is rocky mixed with sand, and the banks are loamy. Soon after the source, another spring adds its water to the flow from the lake. The channel is bordered by typical riverside vegetation and meanders through meadows before being joined by another stream, the Potok, and emptying into the Lahinja River at Črnomelj. The Dobličica and the Lahinja surround the old town center of Črnomelj on three sides.

A catchwater for the White Carniola water system was created near the lake in 1958.

Black olm
In 1986, members of the Slovenian Karst Research Institute discovered black olms (Proteus anginius parkelj) during experimental pumping at the lake.

Sources 
 Inventar najpomembnejše naravne dediščine Slovenije (Lahinja), Ljubljana, 1991

See also 
List of rivers of Slovenia

References

External links
 
 Dobličica at Geopedia

Rivers of White Carniola